Phylloscartes is a genus of small birds in the family Tyrannidae. They are found in wooded habitats of Central and South America. They mainly feed on small arthropods, and most commonly take part in mixed species flocks. The mottled-cheeked tyrannulet is among the commonest birds in its range, but several other species are rare and threatened. Their plumage is predominantly green, yellow, white and grey, and many have contrasting facial patterns and wing-bars. They have thin, pointed bills, and relatively long tails. Most frequently cock their tail, perch relatively horizontally and are very active.

The genus Pogonotriccus has usually been merged into Phylloscartes. In 2004 John Fitzpatrick in the Handbook of the Birds of the World chose to treat Pogonotriccus as a separate genus based on the slight differences in behaviour of the birds in the two genera. Frank Gill and David Donsker then also recognised Pogonotriccus in the list of bird species that they maintain on behalf of the International Ornithological Committee. The evidence for splitting the genus is weak: a 2009 molecular phylogenetic study that included one species from Pogonotriccus and three from Phylloscartes, found that the genetic differences were small.

Species
The genus contains 16 species:

Conservation
Four species in this genus are endangered according to the IUCN. These are: Phylloscartes roquettei, Phylloscartes beckeri, Phylloscartes ceciliae and Phylloscartes lanyoni.

References

 
Tyrannidae
Bird genera
Taxonomy articles created by Polbot